James C. Scott (born December 2, 1936) is an American political scientist and anthropologist specializing in comparative politics. He is a comparative scholar of agrarian and non-state societies, subaltern politics, and anarchism. His primary research has centered on peasants of Southeast Asia and their strategies of resistance to various forms of domination. The New York Times described his research as "highly influential and idiosyncratic".

Scott received his bachelor's degree from Williams College and his MA and PhD in political science from Yale. He taught at the University of Wisconsin–Madison until 1976 and then at Yale, where he is Sterling Professor of Political Science. Since 1991 he has directed Yale's Program in Agrarian Studies. He lives in Durham, Connecticut, where he once raised sheep.

Early life and career
Scott was born in Mount Holly, New Jersey, in 1936. He attended the Moorestown Friends School, a Quaker Day School, and in 1953 matriculated at Williams College in Massachusetts. On the advice of Indonesia scholar William Hollinger he wrote an honors thesis on the economic development of Burma. Scott received his bachelor's degree from Williams College in 1958, and his PhD in political science from Yale University in 1967.

Upon graduation, Scott received a Rotary International Fellowship to study in Burma, where he was recruited by an American student activist who had become an anti-communist organizer for the Central Intelligence Agency (CIA). Scott agreed to do reporting for the agency, and at the end of his fellowship, took a post in the Paris office of the National Student Association, which accepted CIA money and direction in working against communist-controlled global student movements over the next few years. 

Scott began graduate study in political science at Yale in 1961. His dissertation on political ideology in Malaysia, which was supervised by Robert E. Lane, analysed interviews with Malaysian civil servants. In 1967, he took a position as an assistant professor in political science at the University of Wisconsin–Madison. As a Southeast Asia specialist teaching during the Vietnam War, he offered popular courses on the war and peasant revolutions. In 1976, having earned tenure at Madison, Scott returned to Yale and settled on a farm in Durham, Connecticut, with his wife. They started with a small farm, then purchased a larger one nearby in the early 1980s and began raising sheep for their wool. Since 2011, the pastures on the farm have been grazed by two Highland cattle, named Fife and Dundee.

Scott's first books were based on archival research. He is an influential scholar of ethnographic fieldwork. He is unusual for conducting his primary ethnographic fieldwork only after receiving tenure. To research his third book, Weapons of the Weak, Scott spent fourteen months in a village in Kedah, Malaysia between 1978 and 1980. When he had finished a draft, he returned for two months to solicit villagers' impressions of his depiction, and significantly revised the book based on their criticisms and insight.

Major works

James Scott's work focuses on the ways that subaltern people resist domination.

The Moral Economy of the Peasant

During the Vietnam War, Scott took an interest in Vietnam and wrote The Moral Economy of the Peasant: Rebellion and Subsistence in Southeast Asia (1976) about the ways peasants resisted authority. His main argument is that peasants prefer the patron-client relations of the "moral economy", in which wealthier peasants protect weaker ones. When these traditional forms of solidarity break down due to the introduction of market forces, rebellion (or revolution) is likely. Samuel Popkin, in his book The Rational Peasant (1979), tried to refute this argument, showing that peasants are also rational actors who prefer free markets to exploitation by local elites. Scott and Popkin thus represent two radically different positions in the formalist–substantivist debate in political anthropology.

Weapons of the Weak
In Weapons of the Weak: Everyday Forms of Peasant Resistance (1985) Scott expanded his theories to peasants in other parts of the world. Scott's theories are often contrasted with Gramscian ideas about hegemony.  Against Gramsci, Scott argues that the everyday resistance of subalterns shows that they have not consented to dominance.

Domination and the Arts of Resistance
In Domination and the Arts of Resistance: Hidden Transcripts (1990) argues that subordinate groups employ strategies of resistance that go unnoticed. He terms this "infrapolitics." Scott describes the public interactions between dominators and oppressed as a "public transcript"  and the critique of power that goes on offstage as a "hidden transcript."  Groups under domination—from bonded labor to sexual violence—thus cannot be understood merely by their outward appearances.  In order to study the systems of domination, careful attention is paid to what lies beneath the surface of evident, public behavior.  In public, those that are oppressed accept their domination, but they always question their domination offstage. On the event of a publicization of this "hidden transcript", oppressed classes openly assume their speech, and become conscious of its common status.

Seeing Like a State

Scott's book Seeing Like a State: How Certain Schemes to Improve the Human Condition Have Failed (1998) saw his first major foray into political science. In it, he showed how central governments attempt to force legibility on their subjects, and fail to see complex, valuable forms of local social order and knowledge. A main theme of this book, illustrated by his historic examples, is that states operate systems of power toward 'legibility' in order to 'see' their subjects correctly in a top-down, modernist, model that is flawed, problematic, and often ends poorly for subjects. The goal of local 'legibility' by the state is 'transparency' from the top down, from the top of the tower or the center/seat of the government, so the state can effectively operate upon their subjects. The details and arguments amplify Foucault's central notions of governmentality and operations of power.

Scott uses examples like the introduction of permanent last names in Great Britain, cadastral surveys in France, and standard units of measure across Europe to argue that a reconfiguration of social order is necessary for state scrutiny, and requires the simplification of pre-existing, natural arrangements. In the case of last names, Scott cites a Welsh man who appeared in court and identified himself with a long string of patronyms:  "John, ap Thomas ap William" etc. In his local village, this naming system carried a lot of information, because people could identify him as the son of Thomas and grandson of William, and thus distinguish him from the other Johns, the other children of Thomas, and the other grandchildren of William. Yet it was of less use to the central government, which did not know Thomas or William. The court demanded that John take a permanent last name (in this case, the name of his village). This helped the central government keep track of its subjects, but it lost local information.

Scott argues that in order for schemes to improve the human condition to succeed, they must take into account local conditions, and that the high-modernist ideologies of the 20th century have prevented this. He highlights collective farms in the Soviet Union, the building of Brasilia, and Prussian forestry techniques as examples of failed schemes.

The Art of Not Being Governed
In The Art of Not Being Governed: An Anarchist History of Upland Southeast Asia, Scott addresses the question of how certain groups in the mountainous jungles of Southeast Asia managed to avoid a package of exploitation centered around the state, taxation, and grain cultivation. Certain aspects of their society seen by outsiders as backward (e.g., limited literacy and use of written language) were in fact part of the "Arts" referenced in the title: limiting literacy meant lower visibility to the state. Scott's main argument is that these people are "barbaric by design": their social organization, geographical location, subsistence practices and culture have been carved to discourage states to annex them to their territories. Addressing identity in the Introduction, he wrote:

Against the Grain

Published in August 2017, Against the Grain: A Deep History of the Earliest States is an account of new evidence for the beginnings of the earliest civilizations that contradict the standard narrative. Scott explores why we avoided sedentism and plow agriculture; the advantages of mobile subsistence; the unforeseeable epidemics arising from crowding plants, animals, and grain; and why all early states are based on millets, cereal grains and unfree labor. He also discusses the “barbarians” who long evaded state control, as a way of understanding continuing tension between states and non subject peoples.

Other works
In Two Cheers for Anarchism: Six Easy Pieces on Autonomy, Dignity, and Meaningful Work and Play from 2012 Scott says that "Lacking a comprehensive anarchist worldview and philosophy, and in any case wary of nomothetic ways of seeing, I am making a case for a sort of anarchist squint. What I aim to show is that if you put on anarchist glasses and look at the history of popular movements, revolutions, ordinary politics, and the state from that angle, certain insights will appear that are obscured from almost any other angle. It will also become apparent that anarchist principles are active in the aspirations and political action of people who have never heard of anarchism or anarchist philosophy."

Awards and fellowships
Scott is a Fellow of the American Academy of Arts and Sciences and has been awarded resident fellowships at the Center for Advanced Study in the Behavioral Sciences, the Institute for Advanced Study, and the Science, Technology and Society Program at M.I.T. He has also received research grants from the National Science Foundation, the National Endowment for the Humanities, and the Guggenheim Foundation, and was president of the Association for Asian Studies in 1997. In 2020 he was elected to the American Philosophical Society.

Selected bibliography
(Note:  excludes edited volumes.)
 Against the Grain: A Deep History of the Earliest States. 2017
 Decoding subaltern politics. Ideology, disguise, and resistance in agrarian politics. Routledge, 2012 (Critical Asian scholarship ; 8) 
Two Cheers for Anarchism: Six Easy Pieces on Autonomy, Dignity, and Meaningful Work and Play. Princeton University Press, 2012 
The Art of Not Being Governed: An Anarchist History of Upland Southeast Asia. Yale University Press, 2009 
Seeing Like a State: How Certain Schemes to Improve the Human Condition Have Failed. Yale University Press, 1998 
Domination and the Arts of Resistance: Hidden Transcripts. Yale University Press, 1990 
Weapons of the Weak: Everyday Forms of Peasant Resistance. Yale University Press, 1985 
The Moral Economy of the Peasant: Rebellion and Subsistence in Southeast Asia. Yale University Press, 1979 
Comparative Political Corruption. Prentice-Hall, 1972

See also
 Societal collapse
 Zomia

References

External links

Homepage at Yale
James Scott explores governance in the Southeast Asian highlands at Asia Society, November 2010 (w/ video)
interviewed by Alan Macfarlane 26th March 2009 followed by his Mellon Lecture given in Cambridge
Interview with James Scott by Theory Talks, May 2010
Interviewed by Benjamin Ferron and Claire Oger 20th June 2018 (The Conversation)

Williams College alumni
Yale University faculty
American political scientists
Political ecologists
Revolution theorists
Yale Graduate School of Arts and Sciences alumni
1936 births
Living people
Yale Sterling Professors
American anthropologists
Presidents of the Association for Asian Studies
Members of the American Philosophical Society
Moorestown Friends School alumni
People from Mount Holly, New Jersey